The 2010 Jacksonville State Gamecocks football team represented Jacksonville State University as a member of the Ohio Valley Conference (OVC) during the 2010 NCAA Division I FCS football season. Led by 11th-year head coach Jack Crowe, the Gamecocks compiled an overall record of 9–3 with a mark of 6–2 in conference play, placing second in the OVC. Jacksonville played home games at Burgess–Snow Field at JSU Stadium in Jacksonville, Alabama.

In the season opener at Ole Miss, Jacksonville State stunned its NCAA Division I Football Bowl Subdivision (FBS) opponent with a double-overtime upset, 49–48. In the second overtime period, the Gamecocks matched Ole Miss with a touchdown and Crowe ordered his team to attempt a two-point conversion to end the game. Quarterback Coty Blanchard connected with running back Calvin Middleton on a shovel pass in the end zone for the win. Crowe, who had been fired as Arkansas head coach after losing to Division I-AA The Citadel in 1992, said, "If you stay in this long enough, it goes both ways."

Jacksonville State entered the regular season finale against underdogs  ranked fourth in the nation, with a share of the OVC championship on the line. The Gamecocks mounted a 21-play, 94-yard scoring drive that left 11:33 remaining to play and gave them a 24–7 lead. Tennessee Tech, however, successfully mounted four rapid-fire touchdown drives to win, 35–24, and denied Jacksonville State a share of the conference title and an automatic berth to the NCAA Division I Football Championship playoffs. The Gamecocks did receive an at-large berth to the playoff, and after a first-round bye, lost in the second round of to Wofford, 17–14.

Schedule

References

Jacksonville State
Jacksonville State Gamecocks football seasons
Jacksonville State
Jacksonville State Gamecocks football